Stal means steel in many Slavic languages. Stål is a name of Swedish origin.

It may refer to:

People
Carl Stål (1833–1878), Swedish entomologist 
Fanny Stål (1821–1889), Swedish classical pianist
Tord Stål (1906–1972), Swedish film actor

Sports

Norway
IL Stålkameratene, Norwegian sports club

Poland
Stal Ostrów Wielkopolski a Polish basketball team, based in Ostrów Wielkopolski
Stal Gorzów Wielkopolski, a Polish speedway team based in Gorzów Wielkopolski
Stal Gorzyce, a Polish football club based in Gorzyce
Stal Kraśnik, a Polish football club based in Kraśnik
Stal Mielec, a Polish football club based in Mielec
Stal Sanok, a Polish sports club based in Sanok:
Stal Sanok (football)
Stal Sanok (ice hockey)
Stal Stalowa Wola, a Polish sports club based in Stalowa Wola:
Stal Stalowa Wola (sports club)
Stal Stalowa Wola (basketball)
Stal Stalowa Wola (football)
Stal Stalowa Wola (ice hockey)
Stal Rzeszów, a Polish sports club based in Rzeszów:
Stal Rzeszów (multi-sports club)
Stal Rzeszów (football)
Stal Rzeszów (motorcycle speedway)

Russia
FC Stal Oryol, a football club
Stal Volgograd, a football club 
FC Stal Cheboksary, a football club

Ukraine
FC Stal Alchevsk, a Ukrainian football team
FC Stal-2 Alchevsk, the reserve team of Stal Alchevsk
FC Stal Kamianske, a Ukrainian football club located in Kamianske
Stal Dniprodzerzhynsk, a Ukrainian football team

Places
Dolný Štál, a village and municipality in the Dunajská Streda District in the Trnava Region
Stal Stadium (disambiguation), several stadiums

Transport
Putilov Stal-2, a Russian mid-range passenger aircraft
Putilov Stal-3, a transport aircraft designed and built in the USSR from 1933
Putilov Stal-5, a transport aircraft designed in the USSR from 1933. In 1933 Putilov started the design of a flying wing 18 passenger transport

Other
The Tales of Ensign Stål, epic poem by Johan Ludvig Runeberg
 STAL, Swedish company founded in 1913
 "Stal", by C418 from Minecraft - Volume Beta, 2013

See also
Stahl
Staal